Seligmann Kantor (6 December 1857, Sobědruhy – 21 March 1903, Sobědruhy) was a Bohemian-born, German-speaking mathematician of Jewish origin in the Austro-Hungarian Empire. He is known for the Möbius–Kantor configuration and the Möbius-Kantor graph.

Kantor studied mathematics and physics at the Technische Hochschule in Vienna, then studied in 1878 in Rome with Luigi Cremona, in Strasbourg, and in 1880 in Paris. In 1881 he received his Habilitation at the K. K. Deutsche Technische Hochschule (DTH) in Prague. He was appointed there in 1883 a Privatdozent for mathematics and continued in that academic post until 1888. He was considered for a professorship in Vienna, but anti-Semitic political agitation prevented his appointment.

Selected publications

References

1857 births
1903 deaths
Algebraic geometers
Austro-Hungarian mathematicians
Austro-Hungarian Jews